Trichura fulvicaudata is a moth in the subfamily Arctiinae. It was described by Percy Ireland Lathy in 1899. It is found in Paraguay.

References

Moths described in 1899
Arctiini